Grido Helado is a chain of ice cream parlours in Argentina. It was founded by Santiago family from Córdoba, Argentina in the early 2000s. As of today, it has 1,385 parlours in Argentina, Uruguay, Paraguay, and Chile, with plans to expand to Brazil, Bolivia and Spain.

History 
The Santiago Family bought their first parlour in the eighties, but Grido was officially founded in early 2000. 

During 2012, 11 parlours were opened in Uruguay. 

In early 2013, Grido had 30 parlors in Uruguay.

In January 2015, Grido opened the first parlour in Tierra del Fuego, completing its presence in all Argentina provinces.

External links
 Grido Helado

Ice cream brands
Restaurants established in 2000
Ice cream parlors